K-39 is a  east–west state highway in the U.S. state of Kansas. The highway runs from U.S. Route 400 (US-400) to K-7 southwest of Fort Scott.

Route description
It travels east to Benedict, where it turns north toward Buffalo. South of town, K-39 meets US-75 and begins a short,  concurrency with the U.S. Highway. Once leaving US-75, the highway again travels east toward Chanute, where it intersects US-169. The highway continues east  before beginning a  concurrency with US-59. After briefly turning north with US-59, K-39 resumes its easterly route north of Stark. The highway shares a very short overlap with K-3 (less than one mile, 1.6 kilometers) and passes through Hiattville before meeting its eastern terminus at K-7, which completes the connection to US-69.

History
K-39 has been at its current alignment since 1999.  Prior to that the western terminus was located near Elk City.  The portion of the route between Elk City and Fredonia are now county owned roads.  Before 1956, when K-39 was modernized, a large portion of the route was unpaved and used 90 degree turns to travel northeast instead of the current diagonal alignment.

Major Junctions

See also

References

External links

Kansas Department of Transportation State Map
KDOT: Historic State Maps

039
Transportation in Wilson County, Kansas
Transportation in Neosho County, Kansas
Transportation in Bourbon County, Kansas
U.S. Route 73